Weyrauchia marinezae is a species of beetle in the family Cerambycidae. It was described by Martins & Galileo in 2008.

References

Trachyderini
Beetles described in 2008